Worthy can refer to:

People
 Worthy (surname)
 Worthington Worthy Patterson (born 1931), American basketball player
 F. F. Worthington, nicknamed "Worthy"

Places
 Worthy, see List of generic forms in place names in Ireland and the United Kingdom
 Worthy, Somerset, a hamlet near Porlock

Companies
 Worthy Book, a Malaysian voucher booklet publisher
 Worthy.com, an online marketplace for pre-owned luxury goods

Arts and entertainment
 Worthy (album), a 2015 album by Bettye LaVette
 "Worthy" (song), by San Holo
 Worthy, a 2017 album by Beautiful Eulogy
 Worthy, a 2019 album by India Arie
 The Worthy, a group of fictional characters in Marvel comics - see Fear Itself (comics)
 The Worthy, a 2016 movie by Ali F. Mostafa
 "Worthy" character from Spirit Animals

Other uses
 , a Missile Range Instrumentation Ship operated by the United States Army
 Worthy Hotel, Springfield, Massachusetts, on the National Register of Historic Places
 Worthy FM, the onsite radio station of The Glastonbury Festival

See also
 Nine Worthies, a group of nine figures considered paragons of chivalry
 The Worthys, a cluster of four villages in the City of Winchester district, Hampshire, England

Lists of people by nickname